SERVQUAL is a multi-dimensional research instrument designed to capture consumer expectations and perceptions of a service along five dimensions that are believed to represent service quality. SERVQUAL is built on the expectancy-disconfirmation paradigm, which, in simple terms, means that service quality is understood as the extent to which consumers' pre-consumption expectations of quality are confirmed or disconfirmed by their actual perceptions of the service experience. When the SERVQUAL questionnaire was first published in 1985 by a team of academic researchers, A. Parasuraman, Valarie Zeithaml and Leonard L. Berry  to measure quality in the service sector, it represented a breakthrough in the measurement methods used for service quality research. The diagnostic value of the instrument is supported by the model of service quality which forms the conceptual framework for the development of the scale (i.e. instrument or questionnaire). The instrument has been widely applied in a variety of contexts and cultural settings and found to be relatively robust. It has become the dominant measurement scale in the area of service quality. In spite of the long-standing interest in SERVQUAL and its myriad of context-specific applications, it has attracted some criticism from researchers.

SERVQUAL

SERVQUAL is a multidimensional research instrument designed to measure service quality by capturing respondents’ expectations and perceptions along five dimensions of service quality.  The questionnaire consists of matched pairs of items - 22 expectation items and 22 perceptions items - organised into five dimensions which are believed to  align with the consumer's mental map of service quality dimensions. Both the expectations component and the perceptions component of the questionnaire consist a total of 22 items, comprising 4 items to capture tangibles, 5 items to capture reliability, 4 items for responsiveness, 4 items for assurance and 5 items to capture empathy. The questionnaire may be administered as a paper survey, web survey or in a face-to-face interview. Known studies have published high scores for validity and reliability from small to large size sample sizes. In practice, it is customary to add additional items such as the respondent's demographics, prior experience with the brand or category and behavioural intentions (intention to revisit/ repurchase, loyalty intentions and propensity to give word-of-mouth referrals). Thus, the final questionnaire may consist of 60+ items though the 22 questions are the same.  The face to face interview version may take one hour, per respondent, to administer but not the print or web survey forms.

The instrument which was developed over a five-year period; was tested, pre-tested and refined before appearing in its final form. The instrument's developers, Parasuraman, Ziethaml and Berry, claim that it is a highly reliable and valid instrument. Certainly, it has been widely used and adapted in service quality research for numerous industries and various geographical regions. In application, many researchers are forced to make minor modifications to the instrument as necessary for context-specific applications. Some researchers label their revised instruments with innovative titles such as LibQUAL+ (libraries), EDUQUAL (educational context),<ref>Mahapatra, S.S. and Khan, M.S., "A Methodology for Evaluation of Service Quality Using Neural Networks," in Proceedings of the International Conference on Global Manufacturing and Innovation,' July 27–29, 2006</ref> HEALTHQUAL (hospital context)  and ARTSQUAL (art museum).

The SERVQUAL questionnaire has been described as "the most popular standardized questionnaire to measure service quality." It is widely used by service firms, most often in conjunction with other measures of service quality and customer satisfaction. The SERVQUAL instrument was developed as part of a broader conceptualization of how customers understand service quality. This conceptualization is known as the model of service quality or more popularly as the gaps model.The model of service quality

The model of service quality, popularly known as the gaps model was developed by a group of American authors, A. Parasuraman, Valarie A. Zeithaml and Len Berry, in a systematic research program carried out between 1983 and 1988. The model identifies the principal dimensions (or components) of service quality; proposes a scale for measuring service quality (SERVQUAL) and suggests possible causes of service quality problems. The model's developers originally identified ten dimensions of service quality, but after testing and retesting, some of the dimensions were found to be autocorrelated and the total number of dimensions was reduced to five, namely - reliability, assurance, tangibles, empathy and responsiveness.  These five dimensions are thought to represent the dimensions of service quality across a range of industries and settings. Among students of marketing, the mnemonic,  RATER, an acronym formed from the first letter of each of the five dimensions is often used as an aid to recall.

Businesses use the SERVQUAL instrument (i.e. questionnaire) to measure potential service quality problems and the model of service quality to help diagnose possible causes of the problem. The model of service quality is built on the expectancy-confirmation paradigm which suggests that consumers perceive quality in terms of their perceptions of how well a given service delivery meets their expectations of that delivery. Thus, service quality can be conceptualized as a simple equation:

SQ = P- E
 where;

 SQ is service quality
 P is the individual's perceptions of given service delivery
 E is the individual's expectations of a given service delivery

When customer expectations are greater than their perceptions of received delivery, service quality is deemed low. When perceptions exceed expectations then service quality is high. The model of service quality identifies five gaps that may cause customers to experience poor service quality. In this model, gap 5 is the service quality gap and is the only gap that can be directly measured. In other words, the SERVQUAL instrument was specifically designed to capture gap 5. In contrast, Gaps 1-4 cannot be measured, but have diagnostic value.

 Development of the instrument and model 

The development of the model of service quality involved a systematic research undertaking which began in 1983, and after various refinements, resulted in the publication of the SERVQUAL instrument in 1988. The model's developers began with an exhaustive literature search in order to identify items that were believed to impact on perceived service quality. This initial search identified some 100 items which were used in the first rounds of consumer testing. Preliminary data analysis, using a data reduction technique known as factor analysis (also known as principal components analysis) revealed that these items loaded onto ten dimensions (or components) of service quality. The initial ten dimensions that were believed to represent service quality were:

 Competence is the possession of the required skills and knowledge to perform the service. For example, there may be competence in the knowledge and skill of contact personnel, knowledge and skill of operational support personnel and research capabilities of the organization.
 Courtesy is the consideration for the customer's property and a clean and neat appearance of contact personnel, manifesting as politeness, respect, and friendliness.
 Credibility includes factors such as trustworthiness, belief and honesty. It involves having the customer's best interests at prime position. It may be influenced by company name, company reputation and the personal characteristics of the contact personnel.
 Security enables the customer to feel free from danger, risk or doubt including physical safety, financial security and confidentiality.
 Access is approachability and ease of contact. For example, convenient office operation hours and locations.
 Communication means both informing customers in a language they are able to understand and also listening to the customers. A company may need to adjust its language for the varying needs of its customers. Information might include for example, explanation of the service and its cost, the relationship between services and costs and assurances as to the way any problems are effectively managed.
 Knowing the customer means making an effort to understand the customer's individual needs, providing individualized attention, recognizing the customer when they arrive and so on. This in turn helps to delight the customers by rising above their expectations. 
 Tangibles are the physical evidence of the service, for instance, the  appearance of the physical facilities, tools and equipment used to provide the service; the appearance of personnel and communication materials and the presence of other customers in the service facility.
 Reliability  is the ability to perform the promised service in a dependable and accurate manner. The service is performed correctly on the first occasion, the accounting is correct, records are up to date and schedules are kept.
 Responsiveness is the readiness and willingness of employees to help customers by providing prompt timely services, for example, mailing a transaction slip immediately or setting up appointments quickly.

Further testing suggested that some of the ten preliminary dimensions of service quality were closely related or autocorrelated. Thus the ten initial dimensions were reduced and the labels amended to accurately reflect the revised dimensions. By the early 1990s, the authors had refined the model to five factors which in testing, appear to be relatively stable and robust.

 Reliability: the ability to perform the promised service dependably and accurately
 Assurance: the knowledge and courtesy of employees and their ability to convey trust and confidence
 Tangibles: the appearance of physical facilities, equipment, personnel and communication materials
 Empathy: the provision of caring, individualized attention to customers
 Responsiveness: the willingness to help customers and to provide prompt service

These are the five dimensions of service quality that form the basis of the individual items in the SERVQUAL research instrument (questionnaire). The acronym RATER, is often used to help students of marketing remember the five dimensions of quality explicitly mentioned in the research instrument. It is these five dimensions that are believed to represent the consumer's mental checklist of service quality.

Nyeck, Morales, Ladhari, and Pons (2002) stated the SERVQUAL measuring tool “appears to remain the most complete attempt to conceptualize and measure service quality” (p. 101). The SERVQUAL measuring tool has been used by many researchers across a wide range of service industries and contexts, such as healthcare, banking, financial services, and education (Nyeck, Morales, Ladhari, & Pons, 2002).

 Criticisms of SERVQUAL and the model of service quality 

Although the SERVQUAL instrument has been widely applied in a variety of industry and cross-cultural contexts, there are many criticisms of the approach. Francis Buttle published one of the most comprehensive criticisms of the model of service quality and the associated SERVQUAL instrument in 1996 in which both operational and theoretical concerns were identified. Some of the more important criticisms include:

 Face validity: The model of service quality has its roots in the expectancy-disconfimation paradigm that informs customer satisfaction. A number of researchers have argued that the research instrument actually captures satisfaction rather than service quality. Other researchers have questioned the validity of conceptualising service quality as a gap.

 Construct validity: The model's developers tested and retested the SERVQUAL scale for reliability and validity. However, at the same time, the model's developers recommended that applied use of the instrument should modify or adapt them for specific contexts. Any attempt to adapt or modify the scale will have implications for the validity of items with implications for the validity of the dimensions of reliability, assurance, tangibles, empathy and responsiveness.
 
 Ambiguity of expectations construct: SERVQUAL is designed to be administered after respondents have experienced a service. They are therefore asked to recall their pre-experience expectations. However,  recall is not always accurate, raising concerns about whether the research design accurately captures true pre-consumption expectations. In addition, studies show that expectations actually change over time. Consumers are continually modifying their expectations as they gain experience with a product category or brand. In light of these insights, concerns have been raised about whether the act of experiencing the service might colour respondents' expectations.

 Operational definition of the expectations construct: The way that expectations has been operationalised also represents a concern for theorists investigating the validity of the gaps model. The literature identifies different types of expectations. Of these, there is an argument that only forecast expectations are true expectations. Yet, the SERVQUAL instrument appears to elicit ideal expectations.  Note the wording in the questionnaire in the preceding figure which grounds respondents in their expectations of what excellent companies will do. Subtle use of words can elicit different types of expectations.  Capturing true expectations is important because it has implications for service quality scores. When researchers elicit ideal expectations, overall service quality scores are likely to be lower, making it much more difficult for marketers to deliver on those expectations.Questionnaire length:  The matched pairs design of the questionnaire (total of 22 expectation items plus 22 perception items= 44 total items) makes for a very long questionnaire. If researchers add demographic and other behavioural items such as prior experience with product or category and the standard battery of demographics including: age, gender, occupation, educational attainment etc. then the average questionnaire will have around 60 items. In practical terms, this means that the questionnaire would take more than one hour per respondent to administer in a face-to-face interview. Lengthy questionnaires are known to induce respondent fatigue which may have potential implications for data reliability. In addition, lengthy questionnaires add to the time and cost involved in data collection and data analysis. Coding, collation and interpretation of data is very time consuming and in the case of lengthy questionnaires administered across large samples, the findings cannot be used to address urgent quality-related problems. In some cases, it may be necessary to carry out 'quick and dirty' research while waiting for the findings of studies with superior research design.

 Administration of the questionnaire: Some analysts have pointed out that the SERVPERF instrument, developed by Cronin and Taylor,Cronin J.J., Steven, J. and Taylor, A., "SERVPERF versus SERVQUAL: Reconciling performance based  and  perceptions-minus-expectations  measurement  of  service  quality," Journal  of  Marketing,  Vol.  58, January, 1994, pp. 125-131 and which reduced the number of questionnaire items by half (22 perceptions items only), achieves results that correlate well with SERVQUAL, with no reduction in diagnostic power, improved data accuracy through reductions in respondent boredom and fatigue and savings in the form of reduced administration costs.Dimensional instability:  A number of studies have reported that the five dimensions of service quality implicit in the model (reliability, assurance, tangibles, empathy and responsiveness) do not hold up when the research is replicated in different countries, different industries, in different market segments or even at different time periods.Lam, S. K and Woo, K. S.,  "Measuring Service Quality: A test-retest reliability investigation of SERVQUAL,"  Journal of the Market Research Society,  Vol. 39, no. 2, 1997, pp 381-396 Some studies report that the SERVQUAL items do not always load onto the same factors. In some empirical research, the items load onto fewer dimensions, while other studies report that the items load onto more than five dimensions of quality. In statistical terms, the robustness of the factor loadings is known as a model's dimensional stability. Across a wide range of empirical studies, the factors implicit in the SERVQUAL instrument have been shown to be unstable. Problems associated  with  the stability of the factor loadings may be attributed, at least in part, to the  requirement  that  each  new  SERVQUAL  investigation needed  to  make  context-sensitive  modifications to  the  instrument  in  order  to  accommodate the  unique  aspects  of  the focal service setting or problem. However, it has also been hypothesised that the dimensions of service quality represented by the SERVQUAL research instrument fail to capture the true dimensionality of the service quality construct and that there may not be a universal set of service quality dimensions that are relevant across all service industries.

In spite of these criticisms, the SERVQUAL instrument, or any one of its variants (i.e. modified forms), dominates current research into service quality.  In a review of more than 40 articles that made use of SERVQUAL, a team of researchers found that  “few researchers concern themselves with the validation of the measuring tool”.  SERVQUAL is not only the subject of academic papers, but it is also widely used by industry practitioners.

 See also

 Customer satisfaction
 Customer satisfaction research
 Disconfirmed expectancy
 Quality management
 Service quality
 Services marketing

 References 

 External links 

SERVQUAL Instructions - Detailed instructions for administering the SERVQUAL questionnaire

Further reading
 Luis Filipe Lages & Joana Cosme Fernandes, 2005, "The SERPVAL scale: A multi-item instrument for measuring service personal values", Journal of Business Research, Vol.58, Issue 11, pp 1562–1572.
 Deborah McCabe, Mark S. Rosenbaum, and Jennifer Yurchisin (2007), “Perceived Service Quality and Shopping Motivations:  A Dynamic Relationship,” Services Marketing Quarterly, 29 (1), pp 1–21.
 Ralf Lisch (2014). Measuring Service Performance – Practical Research for Better Quality.'' Farnham, Routledge, pp. 147–149. .

Marketing analytics
Knowledge representation
Quality management
Services marketing